Juan Fernando Grabowski (born 9 April 1982) was a retired Argentine footballer.

He played five years in Chile. There, he represented Coquimbo Unido, Everton and Unión San Felipe.

References

 

1982 births
Living people
Argentine footballers
Argentine expatriate footballers
Association football defenders
Footballers from Rosario, Santa Fe
Rosario Central footballers
Oriente Petrolero players
Sarmiento de Resistencia footballers
Sportivo Las Parejas footballers
Total Chalaco footballers
Coquimbo Unido footballers
Everton de Viña del Mar footballers
Unión San Felipe footballers
Argentine expatriate sportspeople in Chile
Argentine expatriate sportspeople in Peru
Argentine expatriate sportspeople in Bolivia
Expatriate footballers in Chile
Expatriate footballers in Peru
Expatriate footballers in Bolivia